Necrolust is a demo album by the Polish death metal band Vader, released in 1989. The cover of the album was designed by Piotr Wiwczarek. Fenriz of Darkthrone cites this demo along with Celtic Frost's Morbid Tales and Bathory's Under the Sign of the Black Mark as key riff inspirations for Panzerfaust.

Track listing

Personnel 
Production and performance credits are adapted from the album liner notes.

 Vader
Piotr "Peter" Wiwczarek – rhythm guitar, lead guitar, lead vocals, bass guitar, cover art, lyrics
Krzysztof "Docent" Raczkowski – drums
Jacek "Jackie" Kalisz – bass (credited but did not perform)

 Production
Władysław Iljaszewicz – sound engineering
Paweł Wasilewski – lyrics

 Note
 Pro Studio, Olsztyn, Poland, February–March 1989

References 

Vader (band) albums
1989 albums